Chiasmocleis hudsoni, also known as Hudson's humming frog, is a species of frog in the family Microhylidae. It is found in French Guiana, Suriname, Guyana, Guianan Venezuela, Colombia (Amazonas), and Amazonian Brazil. Chiasmocleis jimi has been included in this species but the most recent genetic analyses support its recognition as a distinct species; both species might include further distinct lineages that warrant recognition as species.

Etymology
The specific name hudsoni honours C. A. Hudson, the collector of the holotype and a collector for the Natural History Museum, London.

Description
Adult males measure  and adult females  in snout–vent length. The body is robust and ovoid. The head is much narrower than the body; the snout is rounded. All but the first finger are fringed; no webbing is present. The finger tips are rounded and fingers 2–3 are swollen and may present discs. The toes are slightly fringed but have no webbing. Toes 2–4 have terminal discs. The dorsum is purple brown with variable lighter markings. The snout can be white.

Males may possess few but large dermal spines on the chin. The male advertisement call is a repetitive series of multi-pulsed notes.

Habitat and conservation
Chiasmocleis hudsoni is a common species living in tropical rainforests at elevations below . It is a nocturnal, fossorial frog, usually hiding in holes or in the leaf litter. It is an "explosive breeder" using temporary pools for breeding. It is locally threatened by habitat loss caused by clear-cutting. However, it is not threatened overall, and it is present in several protected areas.

References

hudsoni
Amphibians of Brazil
Amphibians of Colombia
Amphibians of French Guiana
Amphibians of Guyana
Amphibians of Suriname
Amphibians of Venezuela
Amphibians described in 1940
Taxa named by Hampton Wildman Parker
Taxonomy articles created by Polbot